

Thomas Finlayson Henderson (25 May 1844 – 25 December 1923), often credited as T. F. Henderson, was a Scottish historian, author and editor. Henderson was a prolific author and contributed entries on Scottish figures for the Dictionary of National Biography and Encyclopædia Britannica. He was considered an authority on poet Robert Burns and  Mary, Queen of Scots.

Biography

Henderson was born in Lathones, Fife, Scotland in May 1844. He was the second of 11 children born to farmer Archibald Henderson and his wife, Catherine (née Finlayson), both of Kincardine-in-Menteith, a village in Perthshire.

He attended the University of St Andrews and joined the staff of the Encyclopædia Britannica. In 1914, the University of St Andrews awarded him an honorary LL.D.

He was an editor for several anthologies of poetry, including the works of Robert Burns. His work with Burns was praised by The Times, which noted, "For the first time Burns was edited with the care usually reserved for editions of the ancient classics." Henderson was also an editor of later editions of The History of England from the Accession of James the Second, considered the foremost historic work of its era, and Minstrelsy of the Scottish Border.

Selected bibliography

with Francis Watt:  (2nd edition 1911; 3rd revised edition 1913)

References

External links

1844 births
1923 deaths
20th-century Scottish historians
Alumni of the University of St Andrews
Writers from Fife
19th-century Scottish historians